is a Japanese professional golfer.

Nishikawa played on the Japan Golf Tour, winning three times.

Professional wins (5)

Japan Golf Tour wins (3)

Japan Golf Tour playoff record (1–1)

Japan Challenge Tour wins (2)
1990 Kanto Kokusai Open, Korakuen Cup (2nd)

Team appearances
Alfred Dunhill Cup (representing Japan): 1993, 2000

External links

Japanese male golfers
Japan Golf Tour golfers
Sportspeople from Tokyo
1968 births
Living people